Şahdağ (until 2004, Shahdagh and Shurakend) is a village and municipality in the Gadabay District of Azerbaijan. It has a population of 2,200.  The municipality consists of the villages of Shahdagh and Arabachy.

References 

Populated places in Gadabay District